The 2017 Tour of the Basque Country was a road cycling stage race that took place between 3 and 8 April. It was the 57th edition of the Tour of the Basque Country and was the fourteenth event of the 2017 UCI World Tour.

Valverde finished 17 seconds clear of four-time race winner Alberto Contador while the all-Spanish podium was completed by the national time trial champion, Ion Izagirre, a further four seconds in arrears of Contador for the  team.

In the race's other classifications, 's Alex Howes won the polka-dot jersey as winner of the mountains classification, Lluís Mas was the winner of the intermediate sprints classification while  won the teams classification.

Route
The full route of the 2017 Tour of the Basque Country was announced on 23 March 2017.

Participating teams
As the Tour of the Basque Country was a UCI World Tour event, all eighteen UCI WorldTeams were invited automatically and were obliged to enter a team in the race. Two UCI Professional Continental teams –  and  – were awarded wildcard places, bringing the number of teams to twenty. As each team included eight riders, a total of 160 riders started the first stage.

Stages

Stage 1
3 April 2017 — Pamplona to Valle de Egüés,

Stage 2
4 April 2017 — Pamplona to Elciego,

Stage 3
5 April 2017 — Vitoria-Gasteiz to San Sebastián,

Stage 4
6 April 2017 — San Sebastián to Bilbao,

Stage 5
7 April 2017 — Bilbao to Eibar,

Stage 6
8 April 2017 — Eibar to Eibar, individual time trial (ITT)

Classification leadership table
In the 2017 Tour of the Basque Country, four different jerseys were awarded. For the general classification, calculated by adding each cyclist's finishing times on each stage, the leader received a yellow jersey. This classification was considered the most important of the 2017 Tour of the Basque Country, and the winner of the classification was considered the winner of the race.

Additionally, there was a points classification, which awarded a white jersey. In the points classification, cyclists received points for finishing in the top 15 in a stage. For winning a stage, a rider earned 25 points, with 20 for second, 16 for third, 14 for fourth, 12 for fifth, 10 for sixth with a point fewer per place down to a single point for 15th place. There was also a sprints classification for the points awarded at intermediate sprints on each stage (except for the time trial stage) – awarded on a 3–2–1 scale – where the leadership of which was marked by a blue jersey.

The fourth jersey represented the mountains classification, marked by a white and red polka-dot jersey. Points for this classification were won by the first riders to the top of each categorised climb, with more points available for the higher-categorised climbs. There was also a classification for teams, in which the times of the best three cyclists per team on each stage were added together; the leading team at the end of the race was the team with the lowest total time.

References

Sources

External links

2017
2017 UCI World Tour
2017 in Spanish road cycling
April 2017 sports events in Spain